The peritoneum is the serous membrane forming the lining of the abdominal cavity or coelom in amniotes and some invertebrates, such as annelids. It covers most of the intra-abdominal (or coelomic) organs, and is composed of a layer of mesothelium supported by a thin layer of connective tissue. This peritoneal lining of the cavity supports many of the abdominal organs and serves as a conduit for their blood vessels, lymphatic vessels, and nerves.

The abdominal cavity (the space bounded by the vertebrae, abdominal muscles, diaphragm, and pelvic floor) is different from the intraperitoneal space (located within the abdominal cavity but wrapped in peritoneum). The structures within the intraperitoneal space are called "intraperitoneal" (e.g., the stomach and intestines), the structures in the abdominal cavity that are located behind the intraperitoneal space are called "retroperitoneal" (e.g., the kidneys), and those structures below the intraperitoneal space are called "subperitoneal" or "infraperitoneal" (e.g., the bladder).

Structure

Layers
The peritoneum is one continuous sheet, forming two layers and a potential space between them: the peritoneal cavity.

The outer layer, the parietal peritoneum, is attached to the abdominal wall and the pelvic walls. The tunica vaginalis, the serous membrane covering the male testis, is derived from the vaginal process, an outpouching of the parietal peritoneum.

The inner layer, the visceral peritoneum, is wrapped around the visceral organs, located inside the intraperitoneal space for protection. It is thinner than the parietal peritoneum. The mesentery is a double layer of visceral peritoneum that attaches to the gastrointestinal tract. There are often blood vessels, nerves, and other structures between these layers. The space between these two layers is technically outside of the peritoneal sac, and thus not in the peritoneal cavity.

The potential space between these two layers is the peritoneal cavity, filled with a small amount (about 50 mL) of slippery serous fluid that allows the two layers to slide freely over each other.

The right paracolic gutter is continuous with the right and left subhepatic spaces. The epiploic foramen allows communication between the greater sac and the lesser sac. The peritoneal space in males is closed, while the peritoneal space in females is continuous with the extraperitoneal pelvis through openings of the fallopian tubes, the uterus, and the vagina.

Subdivisions
Peritoneal folds are omentums, mesenteries and ligaments; they connect organs to each other or to the abdominal wall. There are two main regions of the peritoneal cavity, connected by the omental foramen.
 The greater sac, represented in red in the diagrams above.
 The lesser sac, represented in blue. The lesser sac is divided into two "omenta":
 The lesser omentum (or hepatogastric) is attached to the lesser curvature of the stomach and the liver.
 The greater omentum (or gastrocolic) hangs from the greater curvature of the stomach and loops down in front of the intestines before curving back upwards to attach to the transverse colon. In effect it is draped in front of the intestines like an apron and may serve as an insulating or protective layer.

The mesentery is the part of the peritoneum through which most abdominal organs are attached to the abdominal wall and supplied with blood and lymph vessels and nerves.

Omenta

Mesenteries

Other ligaments and folds

In addition, in the pelvic cavity there are several structures that are usually named not for the peritoneum, but for the areas defined by the peritoneal folds:

Classification of abdominal structures
The structures in the abdomen are classified as intraperitoneal, mesoperitoneal, retroperitoneal or infraperitoneal depending on whether they are covered with visceral peritoneum and whether they are attached by mesenteries (mensentery, mesocolon).

Structures that are intraperitoneal are generally mobile, while those that are retroperitoneal are relatively fixed in their location.

Some structures, such as the kidneys, are "primarily retroperitoneal", while others such as the majority of the duodenum, are "secondarily retroperitoneal", meaning that structure developed intraperitoneally but lost its mesentery and thus became retroperitoneal.

Development
The peritoneum develops ultimately from the mesoderm of the trilaminar embryo. As the mesoderm differentiates, one region known as the lateral plate mesoderm splits to form two layers separated by an intraembryonic coelom. These two layers develop later into the visceral and parietal layers found in all serous cavities, including the peritoneum.

As an embryo develops, the various abdominal organs grow into the abdominal cavity from structures in the abdominal wall. In this process they become enveloped in a layer of peritoneum. The growing organs "take their blood vessels with them" from the abdominal wall, and these blood vessels become covered by peritoneum, forming a mesentery.

Peritoneal folds develop from the ventral and dorsal mesentery of the embryo.

Clinical significance

Imaging assessment
CT scan is a fast (15 seconds) and efficient way in visualising the peritoneal spaces. Although ultrasound is good at visualizing peritoneal collections and ascites, without ionising radiation, it does not provide a good overall assessment of all the peritoneal cavities. MRI scan is also increasingly used to visualise peritoneal diseases, but requires long scan time (30 to 45 minutes) and prone to motion artifacts due to respiration and peristalsis and chemical shift artifacts at the bowel-mesentery interface. Those with peritoneal carcinomatosis, acute pancreatitis, and intraabdominal sepsis may not tolerate prolonged MRI scan.

Peritoneal dialysis

In one form of dialysis, called peritoneal dialysis, a glucose solution is sent through a tube into the peritoneal cavity. The fluid is left there for a prescribed amount of time to absorb waste products, and then removed through the tube. The reason for this effect is the high number of arteries and veins in the peritoneal cavity. Through the mechanism of diffusion, waste products are removed from the blood.

Peritonitis

Peritonitis is the inflammation of the peritoneum. It is more commonly associated to infection from a punctured organ of the abdominal cavity. It can also be provoked by the presence of fluids that produce chemical irritation, such as gastric acid or pancreatic juice. Peritonitis causes fever, tenderness, and pain in the abdominal area, which can be localized or diffuse. The treatment involves rehydration, administration of antibiotics, and surgical correction of the underlying cause. Mortality is higher in the elderly and if present for a prolonged time.

Primary peritoneal carcinoma

Primary peritoneal cancer is a cancer of the cells lining the peritoneum.

Etymology
"Peritoneum" is derived from  via Latin. In Greek,  means "around", while  means "to stretch"; thus, "peritoneum" means "stretched over".

Additional images

See also
Duodenorenal ligament
 Omental bursa (Lesser sac)
 Greater sac
 Omental foramen (Epiploic foramen, Foramen of Winslow)
 Lesser omentum
 Greater omentum

References

External links 

Abdomen